Hacıalılı or Gadzhalyly or Gedzhally may refer to:
Hacıalılı, Barda, Azerbaijan
Hacıalılı, Qabala, Azerbaijan
Hacıalılı, Samukh, Azerbaijan
Hacıalılı, Tovuz, Azerbaijan
Hacıalılı, Zangilan, Azerbaijan

See also
Hacallı (disambiguation)